Woo Sang-kwon (Hangul: 우상권, Hanja: 禹相權; 2 February 1926 – 13 December 1975) was a South Korean football player and coach. He played for the South Korean national team in the 1954 FIFA World Cup and the 1964 Summer Olympics.

Honours
	ROK Army OPMG
Korean National Championship: 1954
Korean President's Cup runner-up: 1957

South Korea
AFC Asian Cup: 1956, 1960
Asian Games silver medal: 1958

Individual
KASA Best Korean Footballer: 1959

References

External links
 Woo Sang-kwon at KFA 
 
 

1926 births
1975 deaths
South Korean footballers
South Korea international footballers
South Korean football managers
Olympic footballers of South Korea
1954 FIFA World Cup players
1956 AFC Asian Cup players
1960 AFC Asian Cup players
AFC Asian Cup-winning players
Footballers at the 1964 Summer Olympics
Asian Games medalists in football
Footballers at the 1958 Asian Games
South Korean military personnel
Footballers from Seoul
Asian Games silver medalists for South Korea
Medalists at the 1958 Asian Games
Association football forwards